The 1957 Wimbledon Championships took place on the outdoor grass courts at the All England Lawn Tennis and Croquet Club in Wimbledon, London, United Kingdom. The tournament was held from Monday 24 June until Saturday 6 July 1957. It was the 71st staging of the Wimbledon Championships, and the third Grand Slam tennis event of 1957. Lew Hoad and Althea Gibson won the singles titles.

Champions

Seniors

Men's singles

 Lew Hoad defeated  Ashley Cooper, 6–2, 6–1, 6–2

Women's singles

 Althea Gibson defeated  Darlene Hard, 6–3, 6–2

Men's doubles

 Gardnar Mulloy /  Budge Patty defeated  Neale Fraser /  Lew Hoad, 8–10, 6–4, 6–4, 6–4

Women's doubles

 Althea Gibson /  Darlene Hard defeated  Mary Hawton /  Thelma Long, 6–1, 6–2

Mixed doubles

 Mervyn Rose /  Darlene Hard defeated  Neale Fraser /  Althea Gibson, 6–4, 7–5

Juniors

Boys' singles

 Jimmy Tattersall defeated  Ivo Ribeiro, 6–2, 6–1

Girls' singles

 Mimi Arnold defeated  Rosie Reyes, 8–6, 6–2

References

External links
 Official Wimbledon Championships website

 
Wimbledon Championships
Wimbledon Championships
Wimbledon Championships
Wimbledon Championships